Brandon Ler is an American politician from the state of Montana, and a Republican member of the Montana House of Representatives for district 35. He owns and operates a fencing company and served for six years on the Savage School District Board of Education.

In February 2023, Ler introduced a bill that would state that misgendering a transgender student or calling them by their dead name —the name they were given at birth — is not considered a discriminatory practice.

Ler characterized the bill as an effort to ensure students aren’t punished by teachers or school officials for references made out of confusion.  

Ler, who is also a rancher stated he “taught his children from a very young age that cows are cows and bulls are bulls. Imagine one day my son goes to school and he is told the facts he has learned are no longer true.”

Montana State Legislature

2020 State House of Representatives election

Ler was uncontested in the general election, having received 4,760 votes.

References

Living people
1985 births
People from Richland County, Montana
Republican Party members of the Montana House of Representatives
21st-century American politicians